Ethmia umbricostella is a moth in the family Depressariidae. It was described by Aristide Caradja in 1927. It is found in China (Sichuan, northern Yunnan).

References

Moths described in 1927
umbricostella